Osina is a town in Ideato North Local Government of Imo State, Nigeria and is under Orlu senatorial zone. Osina has four villages: Eluama, Uhualla, Ofeke, Umuduru/Umuogbu (Durunogbu). The Nnewi – Okigwe road passes through Osina. The Awka – Umuahia road (on which construction was abandoned in the mid 1980s) also passes through Osina.

Geography 
Geographically, Osina falls within the tropical rain forest region of Nigeria. However, some of its village locations suffer from gully erosion, which has reduced the soil in some areas to a porous sandy terrain because the soil is made up of loose Maastrichtian  Ajali sandstone that has little or no cement adherence. The town remains an area of rich agricultural produce and of business trade of the Imo state. It is located about 54 kilometres from Owerri in Imo State, Nigeria and it’s about 73 minutes’ drive via Owerri - Orlu road.

Education 
There are four secondary schools in Osina:
 St Joseph’s Secondary School, Osina
 Secondary Commercial School (Ideal Secondary School), Osina
 Bonus Pastor Catholic Seminary, Osina (Orlu Dioscese)
 St John’s Christosom Anglican Seminary, Osina (Ideato Diocese)

There are six primary schools in Osina:
 Primary School 1 (St Mary’s), Eluama, Osina
 Primary School 2 (St John’s), Ofeke, Osina
 St Nicholas Primary School, Eluama, Osina
 Alaubeojukwu Primary School, Umuogbu, Osina
 Alaogidi Primary School, Uhualla, Osina
 Ihuelefo Primary School, Ofeke, Osina

St Joseph's Nursery,  Primary and Secondary School Osina

Health 
 Osina Community Hospital
 Chika Medical Centre
 Ajebionu Medical Centre (Psychiatric)

Churches and Places of Worship 
 St Mary’s Catholic Church, Osina
 St John’s Anglican Church, Osina
 Kingdom Hall of Jehovah's Witnesses
 New Bethel Anglican Church Osina
 Assemblies of God Church Osina
 Anglican Church of Christ Osina
Anglican Church of Pentecost Durunogbu Osina
 St Michaels Catholic Church Ofe-eke Osina
 St Jude's Catholic Church Ikpa Eluama Osina

Festivals and Entertainment 
 The Annual New Yam Festival (August 4)
 Masquerade Festival – Late October or Early November
 All Christian Festivals (particularly Christmas)

Shopping 
The main shopping centre is the Afor Market, which is open on daily basis between 7am and 7pm, with heightened activities every four days. The Nkwo Market is about 500 metres from the Afor Market and operates every fours days from 2pm to 7pm.

Economy 
Residents of Osina are mainly traders and farmers. The chief crop is palm products such as palm oil, palm kernel, and palm wine.

Most sons and daughters of Osina live in the cities such as Lagos, Onitsha, Owerri, Port Harcourt and Aba.

Social Organisations in Osina 
 Osina Town Union
 Osina Youth Club
 Academic Association of Osina Citizens (ACASOC)
 Ishioha Social Club
 Ideal Social Club
 Umuada Osina (Daughters of Osina)
 Supreme best friends club international Osina
Osina cultural association UK
Osina Renaissance association ( EZUMEZU )

Facilities 
 Osina Micro Finance Bank
 Post Office
 Agility Chemical & Allied Product Nigeria Limited Osina
 Jacike Oil Osina

References

Populated places in Igboland
Towns in Imo State